Baarwan Khiladi is a Pakistani sports drama web series produced by Nina Kashif and Mahira Khan in her debut production under her anner Soul Fry Films. It is directed by Adnan Sarwar. The web series cast include Kinza Hashmi, Shahveer Jafry , Khaqan Shahnawaz, Saba Faisal and Sarmad Khoosat in leading roles with Fawad Khan in a cameo appearance. It was released on 5 March 2022, on OTT platform Tapmad TV.

It was later aired on Express Entertainment, with fist episode was aired on 11 August.

Premise
The plot revolves around a small town young boy who has a passion for cricket and aspires to become a famous cricketer. After his selection in a country's huge cricket league, he faces the hurdles and unjust behaviour but ultimately finds his due.

Cast
 Shahveer Jafry
 Khaqan Shahnawaz
 Danyal Zafar
 Kinza Hashmi
 Saba Faisal
 Sarmad Khoosat
 Mira Sethi
 Ali Tahir
 Fawad Khan

Production
Khan announced about her production debut in February 2022, with revealing the poster and cast of the series on her Instagram handle.

References

Pakistani web series